Steven Shaviro (born April 3, 1954) is an American academic, philosopher and cultural critic whose areas of interest include film theory, time, science fiction, panpsychism, capitalism, affect and subjectivity. He earned a PhD from Yale in 1981, and teaches Film, Culture and English, first at the University of Washington, and now at Wayne State University.

Work
His most widely read book is Doom Patrols, a "theoretical fiction" that outlines the state of postmodernism during the early 1990s, using poetic language, personal anecdotes, and creative prose. He has also written extensively about music videos as an artform.

Shaviro has written a book about film theory, The Cinematic Body, which according to the preface is "about postmodernism, the politics of human bodies, constructions of masculinity, and the aesthetics of masochism." It also examines Julia Kristeva's concept of abjection and the dominance of Lacanian tropes in contemporary academic film theory. According to Shaviro, the use of psychoanalysis has mirrored the actions of a cult, with its own religious texts (essays by Freud and Lacan).

Shaviro's book Connected, Or, What It Means to Live in the Network Society, appeared in 2003. A later book, Without Criteria: Kant, Whitehead, Deleuze, and Aesthetics was published in May 2009. Five years later, he wrote a book about speculative realism in philosophy, inspired by Alfred North Whitehead.

Bibliography 
 Shaviro, Steven (1990). Passion and Excess: Blanchot, Bataille, and Literary Theory, Tallahassee: Florida State University Press.
 ——— (1993). The Cinematic Body, Minneapolis: University of Minnesota Press.
 ——— (1997): Doom Patrols: A Theoretical Fiction about Postmodernism, London: Serpent's Tail.
 ——— (2003). Connected, or What it Means to Live in the Network Society, Minneapolis: University of Minnesota Press.
 ——— (2009). Without Criteria: Kant, Whitehead, Deleuze, and Aesthetics, Cambridge, MA: The MIT Press.
 ——— (2010). Post Cinematic Affect, Winchester: Zer0 books.
 ——— (2014). The Universe of Things: On Speculative Realism, Minneapolis, MN: University of Minnesota Press. 
 ——— (2016). Discognition, Repeater Books.
 ——— (2017). Digital Music Videos, Rutgers University Press, 2017.
 ——— (in progress). Stranded in the Jungle.
 ——— (in progress). Critical Beatdown.

References

External links 
 Shaviro's website and weblog.
 Podcast of lecture at the UCD Humanities Institute - Discognition 
 Speculative Futures - podcast discussion with Shaviro and Alexander R. Galloway, moderated by Eugene Thacker from November 2014.

20th-century American philosophers
21st-century American philosophers
American critics
Continental philosophers
Film theorists
Living people
Philosophers of art
Postmodernists
University of Washington faculty
Wayne State University faculty
Yale University alumni
1954 births